Gol Afzan (also romanized as Gol Afzān; also known as Kilavzan) is a village in Rud Pish Rural District, in the Central District of Fuman County, Gilan Province, Iran. At the 2006 census, its population was 798, in 214 families.

References 

Populated places in Fuman County